Rudy Glenn (born October 12, 1958) is a retired American soccer player who coaches youth soccer.

High school and college
Glenn attended Mannheim American High School in Mannheim, Germany .  He attended Indiana University from 1976-1979 where he played on the men’s soccer team.  During Glenn’s four years with the team, it went to the NCAA championship in 1976 and 1978.  Indiana lost in both games to the University of San Francisco.  However, USF was later disqualified from the 1978 championship.

Professional career
The Chicago Sting of the North American Soccer League (NASL) took Glenn in the first round (third overall) in the 1979 NASL College Draft.  Glenn became an excellent defender with the Sting.  He scored the winning goal in the shootout Penalty shootout (football)#American experiments phase of the 1981 NASL championship game, which had end without a goal after 90 minutes of regulation and 15 minutes of golden goal extra time.  In 1983, the U.S. Soccer Federation, in coordination with the NASL, entered the U.S. national team, known as Team America, into the NASL as a league franchise.  The team drew on U.S. citizens playing in the NASL, Major Indoor Soccer League and American Soccer League.  Glenn left the Sting and signed with Team America.  When Team America finished the 1983 season with a 10-20 record, the worst in the NASL, USSF withdrew the team from the league.  Glenn returned to the Sting and remained with the team until he retired from playing.  In 1984, the Sting won a second NASL championship, the last in the league’s history.  At the end of the season, the NASL folded and the Sting moved to Major Indoor Soccer League (MISL).  Glenn remained with the Sting and played two years in MISL.  During the 1985-1986 season, he played only eight games, scoring one goal, before he was injured.  He was released by the Sting on May 1, 1986.  In October 1986, Glenn joined the Chicago Shoccers of the American Indoor Soccer Association.

National team
In 1984, Glenn earned his only cap with the national team as a substitute for Andy Parkinson in a 0-0 tie with Italy.  In 1987, Glenn also played five games, scoring one goal for the U.S. Futsal Team.

Post playing career
Glenn coached boys sophomore soccer at Niles West High School and girls varsity soccer coach at Niles West High School. Rudy is also the founder of Illinois Sting FC, the girls feeder soccer team for Niles West High School. He now currently coaches Glenview's, Loyola Academy Boys Soccer Team as of 2022.

Assistant Director at FC United out of Glenview Illinois April 2018

References

Glenn coaches boys sophomore soccer at Niles West High School and girls varsity soccer coach at Niles West High School. Rudy is also the founder of Illinois Sting FC, the girls feeder soccer team for Niles West High School.

External links
 Indiana University
 NASL/MISL stats
 Nation Championship 1981 (minute 4:05)

1958 births
Living people
American men's futsal players
American soccer coaches
American soccer players
American Indoor Soccer Association players
Chicago Shoccers players
Chicago Sting (MISL) players
Chicago Sting (NASL) players
Indiana Hoosiers men's soccer players
Major Indoor Soccer League (1978–1992) players
North American Soccer League (1968–1984) indoor players
North American Soccer League (1968–1984) players
Team America (NASL) players
United States men's international soccer players
Association football defenders
Association football midfielders